An Information sign is an indicator of a source of information, or may itself be informatory. Typical information signs include information boards, traffic signs, pointers to a help desk (such as in a public library, a railway station or an airport) or indicators in reference material.

Information board

An information board is a placard that informs people about a place, a building or a historic site.

Traffic signs
Where the Vienna Convention on Road Signs and Signals is applied, the class of traffic signs classed as "information signs" are generally rectangular

Information symbol

The Unicode code block Letterlike Symbols allocates a code point (U+2139) for a symbol that may used to identify an information source. This symbol may be seen in traffic signs (as in Germany) or printed in product manuals to highlight or differentiate informational material. The default form is a lower case, roman type, serif, extra bold, letter , but an italic type form is common.

Infographics
Signage